Michael Bernard Raynes (born 15 October 1987) is an English former professional footballer who plays as a centre-back for Stockport Town.

Career
Born in Wythenshawe, Greater Manchester, Raynes began his career as a trainee at Stockport County. He made his debut in a 2–1 FA Cup 2nd round replay defeat at Swansea City in December 2004, two months after his 17th birthday, and became a regular in the first team during the second half of the 2004–05 season. By the end of the 2007–08 season, he had made over 90 league and cup appearances for Stockport. He signed a new contract in January 2008, keeping him at Stockport until 2010.

He signed a -year contract with Scunthorpe United on 1 February 2010, for an undisclosed fee.

He joined Rotherham United but was transfer-listed by the club in May 2012, and left by mutual consent later in the same month.

He signed a contract with Oxford United on 11 July 2012.

At the end of 2014/2015 season Raynes was released by Mansfield Town after only making a handful of appearances for the club since joining in January 2015. However, he was not a free agent for long as on 20 May 2015 Raynes was signed by Carlisle United F.C by manager Keith Curle on a one-year contract. Raynes smashed home a brace in a 3–2 home victory against League Two strugglers Yeovil Town in October.

In May 2017, he signed a two-year contract with Crewe Alexandra, after turning down a new offer at Brunton Park. Playing against Carlisle on 23 September 2017, Raynes gave away a penalty and scored an own goal as his former team won 5-0. On 17 October 2017, he scored his first goal for Crewe, at Gresty Road against Notts County, but was sent off in his next game, a defeat by Accrington Stanley.

In January 2019, after just six first-team appearances in his second season for Crewe, he was signed on loan by Hartlepool United until the end of the season. Raynes made just three appearances after Hartlepool after succumbing to injury following a 1-1 draw with Leyton Orient on 9 February 2019. At the end of the 2018-19 season, Raynes was released by Crewe, and having done enough to impress in his brief loan spell, signed for Hartlepool on a permanent basis on 23 May 2019. Raynes was released at the end of the 2019-20 season.

Personal life
He graduated from Manchester Metropolitan University in July 2016 with a bachelor's degree in Sports Science.

Career statistics

Club

References

External links

1987 births
Living people
People from Wythenshawe
English footballers
Association football defenders
Stockport County F.C. players
Scunthorpe United F.C. players
Rotherham United F.C. players
Oxford United F.C. players
Mansfield Town F.C. players
Carlisle United F.C. players
English Football League players
Alumni of Manchester Metropolitan University
Crewe Alexandra F.C. players
Hartlepool United F.C. players
Ashton United F.C. players
Stockport Town F.C. players
Stockport County F.C. non-playing staff
Northern Premier League players
North West Counties Football League players